Trentham Gardens railway station (originally named Trentham Park) was the last station built by the North Staffordshire Railway (NSR) and was the terminus of the short  Trentham Park branch.

The line was built to serve Trentham Gardens which had recently been opened to the public as pleasure gardens.

Regular passenger traffic on the branch line was withdrawn between 1927 and 1938 although excursion trains ran frequently.  In 1938 a regular Sunday service was reintroduced but the outbreak of the Second World War led to the discontinuation of these services.

During the war the Bankers' Clearing House – the arrangement of the clearing banks to exchange cheques – was evacuated from London to Trentham Hall and regular goods trains ran to Trentham Park to deliver supplies. Excursion trains continued throughout the war.

After the war excursion trains continued, and in 1946 the station was renamed Trentham Gardens. The growth in car traffic made the branch line less economic and it closed at the end of 1957

Since closure the site of the station has been built upon and is now a housing estate.

References

Further reading

Disused railway stations in Stoke-on-Trent
Railway stations in Great Britain closed in 1957
Railway stations in Great Britain opened in 1910
Former North Staffordshire Railway stations